Satyrium favonius, the oak hairstreak or southern hairstreak, is a butterfly of the family Lycaenidae. It is found in the United States from southern New England and the Atlantic Coast south to peninsular Florida and west to central Illinois, south-eastern Colorado and the Gulf Coast.

The wingspan is 22–38 mm. There are two tails on each hindwing. The undersides of the hindwings are gray brown. Adults are on wing from March to June in one generation per year. They feed on flower nectar as well as the sugary secretions found on Callirhytis galls and honeydew.

The larvae feed on the leaves, buds and male catkins of Quercus species. The species overwinters as an egg.

References

Butterflies described in 1797
Satyrium (butterfly)
Taxa named by James Edward Smith
Butterflies of North America